was a military commander of the Minamoto clan of Japan in the late Heian and early Kamakura periods. During the Genpei War, he led a series of battles which toppled the Ise-Heishi branch of the Taira clan, helping his half-brother Yoritomo consolidate power. He is considered one of the greatest and the most popular warriors of his era, and one of the most famous samurai in the history of Japan. Yoshitsune perished after being betrayed by the son of a trusted ally.

Early life 

Yoshitsune was the ninth son of Minamoto no Yoshitomo, and the third and final son and child that Yoshitomo would father with Tokiwa Gozen. Yoshitsune's older half-brother Minamoto no Yoritomo (the third son of Yoshitomo) would go on to establish the Kamakura shogunate. Yoshitsune's name in childhood was Ushiwakamaru or young bull. He was born just before the Heiji Rebellion in 1160 in which his father and two oldest brothers were killed. He survived this incident by fleeing the capital with his mother, while his half-brother Yoritomo was banished to Izu Province. When he was 10, Yoshitsune was placed in the care of the monks of Kurama temple, nestled in the Hiei Mountains near the capital of Kyoto. There he was taught swordsmanship and strategy, according to some legends by Sōjōbō, to others by Kiichi Hōgen (whose book, Six Secret Teachings, Ushiwakamaru stole). Not wanting to become a monk, Yoshitsune eventually left and followed a gold merchant who knew his father well, and in 1174 relocated to Hiraizumi, Mutsu Province, where he was put under the protection of Fujiwara no Hidehira, head of the powerful regional Northern Fujiwara clan.

Career 

A skillful swordsman, Yoshitsune defeated the legendary warrior monk Benkei in a duel. From then on, Benkei became Yoshitsune's retainer, eventually dying with him at the Siege of Koromogawa.

In 1180, Yoshitsune heard that Yoritomo, now head of the Minamoto clan, had raised an army at the request of Prince Mochihito to fight against the Taira clan (also known as the Heike) which had usurped the power of the emperor. In the ensuing war between the rival Minamoto and Taira samurai clans, known as the Genpei War, Yoshitsune joined Yoritomo, along with Minamoto no Noriyori, all brothers who had not previously met.

Yoshitsune, together with his brother Noriyori, defeated the Taira in several key battles. He also attacked and killed his cousin Minamoto no Yoshinaka, a rival for control of the Minamoto clan, at the Battle of Awazu in Ōmi Province in early 1184 on the orders of Yoritomo.

Yoshitsune, who had by then been given the rank of general, went on to defeat the Taira at the Battle of Ichi-no-Tani in present-day Kobe in March 1184, and again at the Battle of Yashima in Shikoku in March 1185. He finally destroyed them one month later at the Battle of Dan-no-ura in present-day Yamaguchi Prefecture.

Final years 
Following the Genpei War, Yoshitsune was appointed as Governor of Iyo and awarded other titles by cloistered emperor Go-Shirakawa. His suspicious brother Yoritomo, however, opposed the presentation of these titles, and nullified them.

Yoshitsune then secured imperial authorization to ally with his uncle Minamoto no Yukiie in opposing Yoritomo. Incurring Yoritomo's wrath, Yoshitsune fled Kyoto in 1185. His faithful mistress, Shizuka Gozen, carrying his unborn child, fled with him at first, but then was left behind, and soon taken into custody by forces loyal to Yoritomo.

Yoshitsune eventually made his way to Hiraizumi, Mutsu, once again to the protection of Fujiwara no Hidehira, and lived undisturbed for a time. Hidehira's son Fujiwara no Yasuhira had promised upon Hidehira's death to honor his father's wishes and continue to shelter Yoshitsune, but, giving in to pressure from Yoritomo, betrayed Yoshitsune, surrounding his Koromogawa-no-tachi residence with his troops, defeating Yoshitsune's retainers, including Benkei (in a famous "standing death"), and forcing Yoshitsune to commit seppuku. Yasuhira then had Yoshitsune's head preserved in sake, placed in a black-lacquered chest, and sent to Yoritomo as proof of his death. Historical sources differ as to the fate of Yoshitsune's mistress Shizuka and their son.

Yoshitsune is enshrined in the Shirahata Jinja, a Shinto shrine in the city of Fujisawa.

Rumors and legend 
The death of Yoshitsune has been very elusive. According to Ainu historical accounts, he did not commit seppuku, but instead escaped the siege at Koromogawa, fleeing to Hokkaido and assuming the name Okikurumi/Oinakamui. An alternative legend states that after evading death, Yoshitsune made his way past Hokkaido and sailed to the mainland of Asia, re-surfacing as Genghis Khan. This story was invented by Suematsu Kenchō (1855-1920) while he was studying at Cambridge University in 1879, with the aim of improving Japanese prestige in the wake of the Meiji Restoration.

There's a temple Henshoji in Mooka, Tochigi. According to an old temple magazine and tradition, Hitachibō Kaison entrusted a monk Hitachi Nyūdō Nensai with a child of Minamoto no Yoshitsune, Keiwaka, as demanded by Hidehira Fujiwara. Furthermore, according to the tradition of Enmyō-ji temple in Hirosaki, Aomori, Chitose Maru, also known as Keiwakamaru was a child of Yoshitsune, entrusted to Date Tomomune by Kaison. After the adoption Kaison disappeared.

Koshigoe Letter 
The "Koshigoe Letter" was written by Yoshitsune on the 24th day of the 5th month of the second year of Genryaku (June 23, 1185) as he waited in Koshigoe for approval from Yoritomo to enter Kamakura. The letter was Yoshitsune's "final appeal" to Yoritomo of his loyalty.  The letter is a "mixture of bravado and an almost masochistic indulgence in misfortune."  An excerpt:

In literature 

Yoshitsune has long been a popular figure in Japanese literature and culture due to his appearance as the main character in the third section of the Japanese literary classic Heike Monogatari (Tale of the Heike). The Japanese term for "sympathy for a tragic hero", comes from Yoshitsune's title Kurō Hōgan, which he received from the Imperial Court.

Many of the literary pieces that Yoshitsune appears in are legend rather than historical fact. Legends pertaining to Yoshitsune first began to appear in the fourteenth century. In early works at that time, Yoshitsune was described as a sharp-witted military leader. Then, romantic stories about his early childhood and last years of his life appeared as people began to know more about him.

The legends that deal with his public career show Yoshitsune as a great, virtuous warrior. He was often shown as kind to those around him and honorable, but was also shown to be naive.

Legends dealing with Yoshitsune’s childhood show young Yoshitsune (or Ushiwakamaru) with heroic qualities. He is portrayed as a brave and skilled swordsman, despite being a young boy. He was also skilled in music and his studies, and was also said to be able to easily sway the hearts of young women. These legends delve into fantasy more so than the legends about his later life.

Legends which pertain to the time when his half-brother, Yoritomo, turned against him take away some of Yoshitsune’s heroic qualities. He is no longer portrayed as a great warrior, but he retains his knowledge and skills that are valuable in the emperor’s court.

Yoshitsune's escape through the Ataka barrier is the subject of Noh play Ataka and the Kabuki play Kanjinchō. Kanjinchō was later dramatized by Akira Kurosawa in the 1945 movie The Men Who Tread on the Tiger's Tail.

The Gikeiki, or "Chronicle of Yoshitsune" relates events of Yoshitsune's life after the defeat of the Heike.

Family
 Father: Minamoto no Yoshitomo
 Mother: Tokiwa Gozen
 Wife: Sato Gozen (1168–1189)
 Concubine: Shizuka Gozen

Traditional arts 
In addition to The Tale of the Heike and Gikeiki, a great many other works of literature and drama feature him, and together form the sekai ("world") of Yoshitsune, a concept akin to the notion of the literary cycle.

These include:
 Yoshitsune Shin Takadachi (jōruri)
 Yoshitsune Senbon Zakura (jōruri and kabuki)
 Kanjinchō (kabuki)

In the visual arts, Yoshitsune is commonly depicted as a bishōnen, though this is at odds with contemporary descriptions of his appearance.

In popular culture
In Birushana Senki visual novel, Yoshitsune is depicted as two different characters, the female protagonist Shanaou and her childhood friend and love interest Shungen, in Shungen route, it is revealed by Tokiwa Gozen that Shungen is the real Minamoto no Yoshitsune, whereas Shanaou was adopted by the Minamoto family as a daughter and given the name Yoshitsune to conceal Shungen's identity and lineage as the true heir of the Minamoto clan. Shungen is depicted as a brilliant samurai general who is also a gifted scholar and musician a reference to the original Minamoto Yoshitsune in the Tale of Heike. Shanaou was shown to disguised herself as a Shirabyōshi a reference to Yoshitsune's mistress Shizuka Gozen.

See also 

 Benkei
 Kurama-tengu
 Kurozuka (novel)
 Letter from Koshigoe
 Mysteries of Yoshitsune I&II
 Seiwa Genji

References

Further reading 

 Taylor, Alex J. "The Song of Yoshitsune." Illuminations of the Fantastic Online Magazine. Poetry.

External links 
 Biographical Summary
 

1150s births
1159 births
1189 deaths
Kabuki characters
Minamoto clan
People of Heian-period Japan
People of the Genpei War
People of Kamakura-period Japan
Suicides by seppuku
Deified Japanese people
Japanese legends
Japanese folklore